Roberto Pérez Santoni —better known as Papo Christian— is a community leader and philanthropist focused on marginalised communities. Papo began his efforts in 1967 when he organized a food drive for Biafra victims.

References

People from Río Piedras, Puerto Rico
Puerto Rican philanthropists